Errol Aguilera (born 24 May 1978) is a Trinidad and Tobago bobsledder. He competed in the two man event at the 2002 Winter Olympics.

References

External links
 

1978 births
Living people
Trinidad and Tobago male bobsledders
Olympic bobsledders of Trinidad and Tobago
Bobsledders at the 2002 Winter Olympics
Sportspeople from Port of Spain